The Kingdom of England and the Kingdom of Scotland fought dozens of battles with each other. They fought typically over land, and the Anglo-Scottish border frequently changed as a result. Prior to the establishment of the two kingdoms, in the 10th and 9th centuries, their predecessors, the Northumbrians, Picts and Dal Riatans, also fought a number of battles. Major conflicts between the two parties include the Wars of Scottish Independence (1296–1357), and the Rough Wooing (1544–1551), as well as numerous smaller campaigns and individual confrontations. In 1603, England and Scotland were joined in a "personal union" when King James VI of Scotland succeeded to the throne of England as King James I. War between the two states largely ceased, although the Wars of the Three Kingdoms in the 17th century, and the Jacobite risings of the 18th century, are sometimes characterised as Anglo-Scottish conflicts.

This list is arranged in chronological order.

Battles between Northumbria and the Picts/Dal Riatans

Early battles between England and Scotland

First War of Scottish Independence

Siege of Roxburgh Castle (1314)
Battle of Bannockburn (1314)
Battle of Connor (1315)
Siege of Carlisle (1315)
Battle of Kells (1315)
Battle of Skaithmuir (1316)
Battle of Skerries (1316)
Battle of Faughart (1318)
Capture of Berwick (1318)
Battle of Myton (1319)
Battle of Boroughbridge (1322)
Battle of Old Byland (1322)
Battle of Stanhope Park (1327)

Second War of Scottish Independence

Battle of Wester Kinghorn (1332)
Battle of Dupplin Moor (1332)
Battle of Annan (1332)
Battle of Dornock (1333)
Battle of Halidon Hill (1333)
Battle of Boroughmuir (1335)
Battle of Culblean (1335)
Battle of Neville's Cross (1346)
Battle of Nesbit Moor (1355)
Sieges of Berwick (1355 and 1356)

Border Wars
Battle of Duns (1372)
Battle of Otterburn (1388)
Battle of Fulhope Law (1400)
Battle of Nesbit Moor (1402)
Battle of Humbleton Hill (1402)
Battle of Yeavering (1415)
Battle of Piperdean (1435)
Battle of Sark (1448)

Anglo-Scottish Wars

Capture of Roxburgh (1460)
Capture of Berwick (1482)
Battle of Flodden (1513)
Battle of Hornshole (1514)
Battle of Haddon Rig (1542)
Battle of Solway Moss (1542)

Rough Wooing

Burning of Edinburgh (1544)
Battle of Ancrum Moor (1545)
Battle of Pinkie (1547)
Broughty Castle (1547–1550)
Sieges of Haddington (1548–1549)

Reformation

Siege of Leith (1560)

Border skirmishes

Raid of the Redeswire (1575)

Wars of the Three Kingdoms

 Battle of Newburn (1640)
 Battle of Dunbar (1650)
 Battle of Hieton (1650)
 Battle of Inverkeithing (1651)
 Siege of Dundee (1651)
 Battle of Warrington Bridge (1651)
 Battle of Worcester (1651)

External links
Timeline of Scottish Battles in History

England
Scotland
Scotland And England
Battles Between England and Scotland
Battles between